Swinging Brass with the Oscar Peterson Trio is a 1959 studio album by Oscar Peterson, arranged by Russell Garcia.

Track listing
 "Con Alma" (Dizzy Gillespie) – 7:00
 "Blues for Big Scotia" (Oscar Peterson) – 3:51
 "The Spirit-Feel" (Milt Jackson) – 4:38
 "Stockholm Sweetnin'" (Quincy Jones) – 4:05
 "Cubano Chant" (Ray Bryant) – 4:05
 "Little Pea's Blues" (Peterson) – 4:34
 "Close Your Eyes" (Bernice Petkere) – 4:37
 "O.P." (Russell Garcia, Peterson) – 2:53

Personnel

Performance
 Oscar Peterson - piano
 Ray Brown - double bass
 Ed Thigpen - drums
 Russell Garcia - conductor, arranger

Production
 Norman Granz - producer

References

1959 albums
Oscar Peterson albums
Verve Records albums
Albums arranged by Russell Garcia (composer)
Albums produced by Norman Granz
Albums with cover art by David Stone Martin
Albums conducted by Russell Garcia (composer)